John Harvey (born 21 December 1938 in London) is a British author of crime fiction most famous for his series of jazz-influenced Charlie Resnick novels, based in the City of Nottingham.

Writing career
Harvey has published over 100 books under various names, and has worked on scripts for TV and radio. He started writing in the 1970s when he produced a variety of pulp fiction including westerns. He also ran Slow Dancer Press from 1977 to 1999 publishing poetry. His own poetry has been published in a number of chapbooks and two collections, "Ghosts of a Chance" and "Bluer Than This", published by Smith/Doorstop. In 2014 Smith/Doorstop published a New & Selected Poems, "Out of Silence".

The first Resnick novel, Lonely Hearts, was published in 1989, and was named by The Times as one of the 100 Greatest Crime Novels of the Century. Harvey brought the series to an end in 2014 with Darkness, Darkness, which he dramatised for the stage and which was produced at Nottingham Playhouse in 2014.

The next series from Harvey was the Frank Elder series. The first novel in that series, Flesh and Blood, won Harvey the Crime Writers' Association Silver Dagger in 2004, an accolade many crime fiction critics  thought long overdue. In 2007 he was awarded the Diamond Dagger for a Lifetime's Contribution to the genre.

Nottingham links
Harvey moved to Nottingham in the 1960s in order to teach English and Drama at Heanor Aldercar Secondary School in South East Derbyshire. Towards the end of the 1960s he left Nottingham to teach first in Andover, Hampshire, and then in Stevenage, Herts, returning to Nottingham to study for an MA in the Department of American Studies at the University of Nottingham. .

On 14 July 2009 he received an honorary degree (Doctor of Letters) from the University of Nottingham in recognition of his literary eminence and his associations with both the university and Nottingham (particularly in the Charlie Resnick novels).

He is a Notts County F.C. fan and honorary member of its supporters club. Since 2016 he has been President of Bromley House Library. He now lives in London.

Bibliography

Standalone novels

In A True Light (2001)
Gone to Ground (2007) Shortlisted for Theakston's Old Peculiar Crime Novel of the Year Award 2009.
Nick's Blues (2008 - novella)
Far Cry (2009)
A Darker Shade of Blue (2010) (a collection of short stories)
Good Bait (2012)

Charlie Resnick series
Lonely Hearts (1989)
Rough Treatment (1990)
Cutting Edge (1991)
Off Minor (1992)
Wasted Years (1993)
Cold Light (1994)
Living Proof (1995)
Easy Meat (1996)
Still Water (1997)
Last Rites (1998)
Now's The Time: The Complete Resnick Short Stories (2006)
Trouble in Mind (novella also featuring Jack Kiley) (2007)
Cold in Hand (2008)
Darkness, Darkness (Resnick's last case) (2013)

Frank Elder

Flesh and Blood (2004)
Ash and Bone (2005)
Darkness and Light (2006)
Body and Soul (Frank Elder's last case) (19 April 2018)

Scott Mitchell

Amphetamine and Pearls (1976)
The Geranium Kiss
Junkyard Angel (1977)
Neon Madman

Short Stories 

 "The Sun, the Moon and the Stars" (2005), published in The Detection Collection, edited by Simon Brett.

Awards and accolades
1989 - The Times' list of the Hundred Best Crime Novels of the Last Century for Lonely Hearts
1990 - CWA Gold Dagger for Fiction (shortlist): Rough Treatment
1992 - New York Festivals, Bronze medal, Screenplay for Best TV Drama Series: "Resnick: Lonely Hearts"
1995 - CWA Dagger in the Library
1997 - French CWA award for Best Foreign Novel (short list): Off Minor
1998 - Sherlock Award for Best British Detective, Charlie Resnick: Last Rites
1999 - Sony Radio Drama Silver Award for adaptation of Graham Greene's "The End of the Affair"
2000 - Grand Prix du Roman Noir Étranger:" Cold Light"
2004 - CWA Silver Dagger for Fiction: Flesh and Blood
2004 - Barry Award for Flesh and Blood
2007 - CWA Cartier Diamond Dagger award for a Lifetime's Achievement in the Field
2007 - Theakston's Old Peculier Crime Novel of the Year Award (longlist): Ash & Bone
2007 - Prix du Polar Europeen : "Ash & Bone"
2009 - Honorary Degree, Doctor of Letters : University of Nottingham
2013 - Honorary Degree, Doctor of Letters : University of Hertfordshire
2014 - CWA Short Story Dagger : "Fedora"

References

External links
 Official website
 The story behind "Darkness, Darkness" - Online Essay by John Harvey

Alumni of the University of Nottingham
1938 births
Living people
Cartier Diamond Dagger winners
Alumni of Goldsmiths, University of London
Barry Award winners